The Oroha (pronounced ) are a Melanesian people inhabiting several villages on the
southern end of Small Malaita in the Solomon Islands. They
typically speak the Oroha language, use Pijin as a lingua franca,
can commonly read Sa'a, and learn English in school.

Ethnic groups in the Solomon Islands
Indigenous peoples of Melanesia

References